Trusty's Hill is a small vitrified hillfort about a mile to the west of the present-day town of Gatehouse of Fleet, in the parish of Anwoth in the Stewartry district of Dumfries and Galloway.

The site is notable for a carved Pictish stone located near the entrance to the fort, one of only a handful of such stones found outside the core Pictish heartland of North-East Scotland.  Recent (2012) archaeological investigation has also found evidence of feasting and high-status metalworking at the site, and what has been interpreted as a constructed ceremonial processional route. Together these have led to speculation that the site might have been an important centre or location of royal inaugurations for a Brythonic kingdom centred in Galloway and South-West Scotland, circa 600 AD — perhaps to be identified with the elusive north British kingdom of Rheged, which gained greatest prominence under its legendary leader Urien at a similar time in the late 6th century before apparently utterly disappearing in the early 7th century.

Description and history

Further reading 

 Ronan Toolis and Christopher Bowles (2017), The Lost Dark Age Kingdom of Rheged: the Discovery of a Royal Stronghold at Trusty’s Hill, Galloway. Oxford: Oxbow Books, . (Publisher's website; JSTOR; Google Books). Official published report of the 2012 investigation.
 Interim report, October 2012

External links 
 
 Ronan Toolis (May 2017), Rheged rediscovered: uncovering a lost British kingdom in Galloway, Current Archaeology, 327
 James Hoare (31 January 2017), The Lost Kingdom of Rheged: What the Trusty’s Hill dig can tell us about Celtic Britain, History Answers
 Discovery of Lost Dark Age Kingdom In Galloway, Guard Archaeology, 15 January 2017
 The Galloway Picts Project, Excavation website
 A Window on Dark Age Galloway, Gatehouse of Fleet community and visitor website, Gatehouse Development Initiative.

Archaeological sites in Dumfries and Galloway
Scheduled Ancient Monuments in Dumfries and Galloway
Hill forts in Scotland
Kirkcudbrightshire
6th century in Scotland
7th century in Scotland